Michael James Peterson (born August 7, 1959) is an American country music artist. He made his debut on the country music scene in 1997 with his second self-titled album (following his 1986 release featuring contemporary Christian songs), which produced five Top 40 hits on Billboards Hot Country Singles & Tracks, including the Number One hit "From Here to Eternity". Peterson's second album, 1999's Being Human, produced two more chart singles, and a third album, 2004's Modern Man, was issued only in Europe. Peterson also made a cameo appearance on an episode of Walker, Texas Ranger.

Biography
Michael Peterson was born in Tucson, Arizona, on August 7, 1959. At an early age, he was influenced by the music that his grandmother listened to, such as Cole Porter and Roger Miller.

After attending high school at Richland High School in Richland, WA, Peterson later earned a football scholarship to Pacific Lutheran University, where he won a national championship. One of his teammates, Brad Westering, was also working as a producer for Deniece Williams at the time. Through Westering, Peterson got the opportunity to write songs for Williams, as well as gospel headliners The Imperials. This all led to the production of Peterson's first release, "Michael Peterson", a collection of contemporary Christian songs, on Sparrow Records in 1986. Eventually, Peterson traveled to Nashville, Tennessee, where he started working as a professional songwriter, collaborating with other writers such as Josh Leo and Robert Ellis Orrall.

Michael Peterson
Orrall suggested that Peterson sign to a recording contract, and in December 1996, Peterson was signed to Reprise Records, a division of the Warner Music Group. His debut single, "Drink, Swear, Steal & Lie", was released that year, charting at No. 3 on the Billboard country charts and No. 86 on the Billboard Hot 100. It was the lead-off single to Peterson's self-titled debut album (not to be confused with the Christian album of the same name from 1986), which also produced four more chart singles. The second one, "From Here to Eternity", became Peterson's first and only Number One hit, while "Too Good to Be True" reached No. 8. Following it were "When the Bartender Cries" at No. 37 and "By the Book" at No. 19. The album was certified gold by the RIAA for shipping 500,000 copies in the U.S. Also in 1997, Peterson was named Male Artist of the Year by Billboard.

In 1998, Peterson appeared on Jenny Simpson's 1998 self-titled album, singing duet vocals on "Grow Young with You". Peterson made a guest appearance on a 1998 episode of Walker, Texas Ranger called "Eyes of a Ranger."

Being Human
Peterson released his second album, Being Human, in 1999. Its lead-off single, "Somethin' 'bout a Sunday", failed to reach top 40, and "Sure Feels Real Good" peaked at No. 39. Also in 1999, Peterson co-wrote the title track to Travis Tritt's album No More Looking over My Shoulder, which was released as a single. After a Super Hits album for the label, Peterson exited Warner Music Group.

Modern Man
After his departure from Warner, Peterson signed to Monument Records Nashville. His third studio album, Modern Man, was to have been released in 2002 for the label. Although its title track and "Lesson in Goodbye" both entered the country charts (with the former being the highest-debuting single of his career), the album itself was not issued in the US due to a restructuring of the label's parent company. AGR, a European record label, acquired the album and issued it in Europe in 2004. Six singles were released from it in Europe, including Peterson's own rendition of "No More Looking over My Shoulder." Also included on the album was the track "Right About Now", which Ty Herndon later released from his 2007 album of the same name.

After Modern Man
Peterson's songs have been covered by a number of artists. Though his last charting single was in 2002, he continues to release albums and performs at military benefits.

Discography

Studio albums

Compilation albums

Singles

A"By the Book" did not enter the Hot 100, but peaked at number 1 on Bubbling Under Hot 100 Singles, which acts as a 25-song extension of the Hot 100.

Music videos

Awards and nominations

Awards
TNN/Music City News Awards
 1998 Male Star of Tomorrow

Nominations
Country Music Association
 1998 Horizon Award

Academy of Country Music
 1997 Top New Male Vocalist

References

External links

 Michael Peterson Music

1959 births
American country singer-songwriters
American male singer-songwriters
Living people
Musicians from Tucson, Arizona
Reprise Records artists
Pacific Lutheran University alumni
Country musicians from Arizona
Singer-songwriters from Arizona